is a city located in Hiroshima Prefecture, Japan. The city was founded on November 15, 1936. As of July 31, 2016, the city has an estimated population of 97,324 and a population density of 206.62 persons per km2. The total area is 471.03 km2.

On March 22, 2005, the town of Daiwa (from Kamo District), the town of Kui (from Mitsugi District), and the town of Hongō (from Toyota District) were merged into Mihara.

History
 Mihara Castle was established as a waterfront castle (Umi-jiro) by Kobayakawa Takakage in 1582.
 The castle has been connected to the Seto Inland Sea to operate the Mōri clan water forces on the sea.
 For the Battle of Sekigahara, Fukushima Masanori entered Hiroshima Castle in 1600, and then Mihara Castle has been under controlled as the branch castle of Hiroshima castle.
 The domain was divided into Fukuyama Domain and Hiroshima Domain in 1619, and  entered Mihara castle.
 Mihara was incorporated into a part of Hiroshima Prefecture for the Abolition of the han system in 1871.
 Mihara city was founded on November 15, 1936.
 On March 22, 2005, the town of Daiwa (from Kamo District), the town of Kui (from Mitsugi District), and the town of Hongō (from Toyota District) were merged into Mihara.

Geography

Climate
Mihara has a humid subtropical climate (Köppen climate classification Cfa) characterized by cool to mild winters and hot, humid summers.

Demographics
Per Japanese census data, the population of Mihara in 2020 is 90,573 people. Mihara has been conducting censuses since 1960.

Economy

Fisheries
 Shunami Port
 Nouji Port

Industries
 Mitsubishi Heavy Industries's Itozaki, Kohama and Wada Plants
 Teijin Mihara Plant
 Sharp Mihara Plant
 Dai Nippon Printing Mihara Plant
 Koyo Dockyard
 Mexichem Flúor Mihara Plant

Sister cities
  – Yugawara, Kanagawa, Japan
  – Palmerston North, New Zealand

Educational Facilities
 Prefectural University of Hiroshima Mihara
 Mihara Nursing School

Transportation

Airports
 Hiroshima Airport

Trains
 JR West lines
 Sanyō Shinkansen; Mihara Station
 San'yō Main Line; Itozaki Station, Mihara and Hongo Station
 Kure Line; Mihara, Sunami Station and Akisaizaki Station

Buses
 Geiyo Bus
 Chugoku Bus
 Tomotetsu Bus
 Onomichi Bus

Highways
 Sanyō Expressway

National Routes
 Japan National Route 2, 185, 486 and 432

Ports
 Mihara Port
 Onomichi-itozaki Port
 Sagi Port
 Sunami Port

Tourism

Castles
 Mihara Castle
 Niitakayama Castle - A castle ruin, one of the  Continued Top 100 Japanese Castles.
 Takayama Castle

Temples
 Daizen-ji
 Buttsū-ji – Chūgoku 33 Kannon Pilgrimage #12

Shrines
 Mitsugi-hachimangu

Festivals
 Mihara Yassa Matsuri

 Mihara Shinmeiichi Festival
 Satsuki Matsuri

People

Historical
 Kobayakawa Takakage
 Fukushima Masanori 
 Lady Kasuga
 Inaba Masanari

Famous
 Ayako Miyake (三宅綾子), dancer
 Choji Murata (村田兆治), baseball player
 Ko Hiura (火浦功), novelist
 Yoshihisa Ishida (石田義久), shot putter
 Leyona, singer and songwriter
 Masatoshi Kawahara, manga artist
 Ryuji Imada, professional golfer
 Satoshi Urushihara, manga artist
 Hisatoshi Shintaku, long-distance runner
 Toshiko Shirasu-Aihara, former Japanese gymnast and Bronze medalist of 1964 Summer Olympics in Tokyo
 Keiko Ikeda, former Japanese gymnast and Bronze medalist of 1964 Summer Olympics in Tokyo

Entertainment
A small island off the coast of Sagishima, called Sukune, was the location of Kaneto Shindo's film The Naked Island released in 1960. Director Shindo and his wife Nobuko Otowa both had their ashes scattered on the island.

References

External links

 Mihara City official website 

Cities in Hiroshima Prefecture
Port settlements in Japan
Populated coastal places in Japan